Rhododendron principis is an evergreen shrub growing  tall, with leathery leaves and pink flowers. This species grows in open forest at  altitude in Xizang, China.

References

External links
Encyclopedia of Life page for Rhododendron principis
Global Biodiversity Information Facility page for Rhododendron principis

principis